The Rengstorff House was one of the first houses to be built in Mountain View, California. It was built c. 1867 by Henry Rengstorff, a prominent local businessman who operated a ferry between San Francisco and Mountain View. It is built in the Italianate Victorian architecture style. The house's three-bay front facade features an entrance pavilion topped by a balustrade and a pediment on the middle bay.

History 
Henry Rengstorff built the house near Rengstorff Landing, an important grain shipping point.  The house was built to demonstrate his prosperity, and to raise his six children in comfort, including a room built solely for his four girls, to accommodate their regular appointment with a dressmaker to try on the latest fashions.  When Rengstorff died in 1906, his daughter Elise Haag and grandson Perry Askam moved into the house. Descendants of Rengstorff would live in the house until 1959. The ranch on which the house was located was purchased by the Newhall Development Company, which had no use for the house; a 1972 plan to move it was abortive.

After the house was placed on the National Register of Historic Places in 1978, Mountain View mayor Richard Wilmuth wanted to restore it in place. Construction encroached and in January 1979 a company planning to construct an industrial park on the house's land suggested it be moved north to Shoreline Park. The land was purchased by the city in 1979 and the house was moved onto Shoreline Park land in January 1980. To make way for the Marine World/Africa USA theme park the house was moved again in 1986, further into Shoreline Park, to its current location. After a major renovation costing about $1 million, funded by the city, the house was opened to the public in April 1991. It has since been used for weddings and miscellaneous events;  it is open to the public on Tuesdays and Wednesdays.

See also 

 National Register of Historic Places listings in Santa Clara County, California

References

External links 

 Official Website
 A trip to the Haunted Mansion
 Docent-Led Tours
 3D tour

Houses in Santa Clara County, California
Buildings and structures in Mountain View, California
Houses on the National Register of Historic Places in California
National Register of Historic Places in Santa Clara County, California
Museums in Santa Clara County, California
Historic house museums in California
Italianate architecture in California
Victorian architecture in California